EH, Eh, or eh may refer to:

Arts and media
 "Eh", a song by Death Grips from the album Bottomless Pit
 Eh? (play), a 1966 play by dramatist Henry Livings from London
 English Hymnal, published in 1906 for the Church of England
 Ernest Hemingway (1899–1961), American novelist, short story writer, and journalist

Businesses and organizations
 ANA Wings (IATA airline code EH)
 EHang, a Chinese vehicle company (NASDAQ stock ticker EH)
 Eisenbahn und Häfen GmbH, a German rail freight company
 English Heritage, a registered charity that manages the National Heritage Collection of the UK
 Sociedad Anónima Ecuatoriana de Transportes Aéreos (IATA airline code EH)

Places
 EH postcode area, UK postcodes for addresses in Edinburgh and the Lothians, Scotland
 Eastern Hemisphere, Global Indicator used for journeys within or between TC Area 1 and Area 3
 Euskal Herria, Basque Country
 Eusoff Hall, a Hall of Residence in the National University of Singapore
 Western Sahara, ISO country code digram (stood for the Spanish Sahara before 1985)
 .eh, Internet country code top-level domain for the Western Sahara

Science and technology
Exahenry, an SI unit of inductance
Exception handling, in computer programming languages
Holden EH, an early Australian Holden car
Early Helladic, a period in Southern Balkan Prehistory
Hartree (written Eh), an atomic unit of energy
Reduction potential (written ), a chemical property
 Exponential hierarchy, a computational complexity class

Other uses
 Eh, a spoken interjection in English, Italian, and Spanish
 ANA Wings IATA airline code. It inherits the code from one of its predecessors, the former Air Nippon Network.

See also
 
 
 EHD (disambiguation)
 MEH (disambiguation)
 Heh (disambiguation)